On 2 September 2022, a suicide bombing occurred at a mosque in Herat, Afghanistan.

During Friday noon prayers, a suicide bombing occurred at Guzargah Mosque, which is Sunni and is located in the west of Herat city in northwestern Afghanistan. At least 18 people were killed, including its imam, Mujib Rahman Ansari, who was a Taliban supporter.

References

2022 murders in Afghanistan
2020s building bombings
21st century in Herat
21st-century mass murder in Afghanistan
Attacks on buildings and structures in 2022
Attacks on religious buildings and structures in Afghanistan
Building bombings in Afghanistan
Crime in Herat Province
Mass murder in 2022
Mosque bombings in Asia
September 2022 crimes in Asia
September 2022 events in Afghanistan
Suicide bombings in 2022
Suicide bombings in Afghanistan
Terrorist incidents in Afghanistan in 2022